Nicolae Neacșu (1924, in Isaccea, Tulcea – 3 September 2002, in Clejani, Giurgiu) was a Romanian lăutar, an important member of the Taraf de Haïdouks, a well-known Romani band from Clejani, Romania. He was considered to be one of the best Romani violinists in the world. His main disciple was Gheorghe "Caliu" Anghel, who still plays in the Taraf de Haïdouks.

References

External links 
Obituary at PassiOn Music 

1924 births
2002 deaths
Romani fiddlers
Romani violinists
Romanian Romani people
Lăutari and lăutărească music
20th-century violinists